John Edvin Vikström (born October 1, 1931 in Kronoby, Finland) is a Finnish priest.  He served as the Archbishop emeritus of Turku and Finland from 1982 to 1998.

Personal life
John was born to parents Edvin and Hilma Vikström. In 1957 he married teacher Birgitta Vikström (b. Hellberg) who died in 1994. John Vikström has three children. His brother Erik Vikström and his son Björn Vikström are both his successors as bishop of Porvoo/Borgå.

Archbishop of Turku and Finland 1982–1998 

As the 53rd successor of St. Henry, Vikström's era was far reaching. During his term as the Archbishop of the Evangelical Lutheran Church of Finland, the Church carried out many reforms. The Church was given a new Bible translation and a new hymnbook, the ordained ministry has been opened to women, church law was reformed and liturgical reform was undertaken. The Church of Finland was also active ecumenically.

Archbishop emeritus John Vikström continues to be a popular speaker in academia and business.
 
John Vikström has also publicly embraced the idea of a basic income as a solution to social exclusion:

The archbishop has placed the chairmanship of the Church's Social-Ethical Forum as his priority. The forum's aim is to resolve problems in the status of the elderly and poor in Finland.

An acclaimed author of numerous books and papers, his correspondence with Jörn Donner was voted as Book of the Year in 2002.

Theological merits 

Studies and career

 Helsinki University:
 Bachelor of Theology (1956)
Åbo Akademi:
Licenciate of Theology (1962)
Doctor of Theology (1966) (subject of doctorate: Religion and Culture)
Stipendiate of World Council of Churches in Tübingen, Germany (1956–1957)
 Ordained June 12, 1956
 Ex officio position in the Esbo Swedish parish (1957)
 Pastor of Diaconia in the Borgå Diocese (1957–1961)
 Assistant of Systematic Theology (1963–1964), lecturer at Åbo Akademi (1966-1970)
 Associate Professor of Ethics and Philosophy of Religion at Åbo Akademi (1970)
Bishop of Borgå Diocese (1970–1982)
 Archbishop of Turku and Finland (1982–1998)

Awards and prizes

Honorary doctor:
Leningrad Theological Academy (1985)
Budapest Lutheran Theological Academy (1987)
Finlandia University, Hancock, United States (1998)
Åbo Akademi (2002)
University of Vaasa (2006)

Hallberg Prize (1967)
Swedish Cultural Fund Prize (1981)
Decoration of the Grand Cross of German Democratic Republic (1989)
Order of the White Rose - Grand Cross (1986)
Cross of Apostle and Evangelist Mark, 1st Class (1989)
Order of the Holy Lamb, Commander 1st Class (1991)
Medal of Jordanian Independence, 1st Class (1993)
Lambeth Cross (1994)
Anders Chydenius Prize (1995)
Swedish Finland Award, in silver (1996)
Finland's Communal Union Award, in gold (1997)
Friends of the Swedish Folk School Award (1998)
Medal of Merit, Defence Forces of Finland, in gold (1998)
Medal of Journalism and Press (1999)
Cross of Maarjamaa (2001)
Cross of St. Henry (2007)

Bibliography

Religion och kultur. Grundproblemet i G.G. Rosenqvists religiösa tänkande (1966)
Religionssociologin i Finland (1967)
Kyrka och revolution (1968)
Kyrkan och kulturradikalismen (1968)
Effekten av religiös fostran (1970)
Tro i kris (1972) 
Fråga biskopen om tro (1980) 
Ihmisen usko (1982) 
Herdestaven (1982) 
Kuitenkin (Trots allt) (1983) 
Uusi rohkeus elää (1985) 
Kirjeen kääntöpiiri (Öppna svar) (with Eero Silvasti) (1987) 
Suuntaviittoja (1988) 
Myös maan päällä (1992)
Reconciliation and Hope (1998)
Att leva är att dö (2000) (with Jörn Donner) 
Vapaus ja vakaumus (2003) 
Toivo ja elämä (2005)

External links 

1931 births
Living people
People from Kronoby
Swedish-speaking Finns
Lutheran archbishops and bishops of Turku
20th-century Lutheran archbishops
Recipients of the Order of the Cross of Terra Mariana, 2nd Class
University of Helsinki alumni
Åbo Akademi University alumni
Academic staff of Åbo Akademi University
Recipients of the Order of Independence (Jordan)